Ramón Soria Alonso (born 7 March 1989) is a Spanish professional footballer who plays as a defender.

Club career

Early career
Soria spent five seasons developing with Villareal, which included one year with their reserve team for the 2008-2009 season. Soria would then join RCD Mallorca B from 2009-2011 where he also served as captain. Over the next three seasons Soria would play for three different Spanish clubs - Albacete Balompié, FC Jove Español and Teruel, before spending a short time in Norway with Gjøvik FF.

Ottawa Fury
Soria signed with NASL club Ottawa Fury FC as their first defender in the club's history on December 13, 2013.

Celje
In February 2016, Soria signed with Slovenian PrvaLiga club NK Celje.

Puerto Rico FC
In March 2016, Soria signed for NASL expansion side Puerto Rico.

Formentera
On 30 January 2018, Soria returned to Spain to sign with Segunda B side SD Formentera until the end of the season. He made 15 league appearances for Formentera and scored one goal.

FC Edmonton
On 31 January 2019, Soria signed with Canadian Premier League side FC Edmonton. On February 9, 2022, the club announced that Soria and all but two other players would not be returning for the 2022 season.

International career
Soria has represented Spain at the U16, and U17 levels, including at the 2006 UEFA European Under-17 Football Championship in Luxembourg where Spain finished third.

Career statistics

References

External links

1989 births
Living people
Association football defenders
Spanish footballers
Footballers from Alicante
Spanish expatriate footballers
Expatriate footballers in Norway
Spanish expatriate sportspeople in Norway
Expatriate soccer players in Canada
Spanish expatriate sportspeople in Canada
Expatriate footballers in Slovenia
Spanish expatriate sportspeople in Slovenia
Expatriate footballers in Puerto Rico
Spanish expatriate sportspeople in Puerto Rico
Villarreal CF players
RCD Mallorca B players
Albacete Balompié players
Ottawa Fury FC players
NK Celje players
Puerto Rico FC players
FC Edmonton players
Segunda División B players
Tercera División players
Norwegian Second Division players
North American Soccer League players
Slovenian PrvaLiga players
Canadian Premier League players
Spain youth international footballers
SD Formentera players